Permanent vegetative cover refers to trees, perennial bunchgrasses and grasslands, legumes, and shrubs with an
expected life span of at least 5 years.

In the United States, permanent cover is required on cropland entered into the Conservation Reserve Program.

References 

Habitats
Plant conservation
Agriculture and the environment
Biology terminology
Environmental terminology
Habitat
Plants
Sustainable agriculture